Panagoula Vemi (born 26 May 1971) is a Greek handball player who competed in the 2004 Summer Olympics.

References

1971 births
Living people
Greek female handball players
Olympic handball players of Greece
Handball players at the 2004 Summer Olympics
Sportspeople from Patras